Pool B of the 2022 Billie Jean King Cup Europe/Africa Zone Group II was one of two pools in the Europe/Africa zone of the 2020–21 Billie Jean King Cup. Four teams competed in a round robin competition, with the top teams and the bottom teams proceeding to their respective sections of the play-offs: the top teams played for advancement to Group I in 2023.

Standings 

Standings are determined by: 1. number of wins; 2. number of matches; 3. in two-team ties, head-to-head records; 4. in three-team ties, (a) percentage of matches won (head-to-head records if two teams remain tied), then (b) percentage of sets won (head-to-head records if two teams remain tied), then (c) percentage of games won (head-to-head records if two teams remain tied), then (d) Billie Jean King Cup rankings.

Round-robin

Luxembourg vs. Israel

Finland vs. Lithuania

Luxembourg vs. Lithuania

Finland vs. Israel

Luxembourg vs. Finland

Lithuania vs. Israel

References

External links 
 Fed Cup website

2022 Billie Jean King Cup Europe/Africa Zone